Leander Adrian Paes  (born 17 June 1973) is an Indian former professional tennis player. He is regarded as one of the greatest doubles tennis players ever. He holds the record for the most doubles wins in the Davis Cup. Paes won eight men's doubles and ten mixed doubles Grand Slam titles. He holds a career Grand Slam in men's doubles and mixed doubles, and achieved the rare men's/mixed double at the 1999 Wimbledon Championships. His mixed doubles Wimbledon title in 2015 made him the second man (after Rod Laver) to win Wimbledon titles in three decades.

Paes received the Major Dhyan Chand Khel Ratna award, India's highest sporting honor, in 1996–97; the Arjuna Award in 1990; the Padma Shri award in 2001; and India's third-highest civilian award, the Padma Bhushan prize in January 2014, for his outstanding contributions to tennis. He won a bronze medal for India in men's singles at the 1996 Atlanta Olympic Games. He competed in consecutive Olympics from 1992 to 2016, making him the first Indian and the only tennis player to compete in seven Olympic Games.

He is a former Davis Cup team captain, and holds the record for the most Davis Cup doubles wins with 43 victories. He played in World Team Tennis for the Washington Kastles. He was on the 2009, 2011, 2012, 2013, 2014, and 2015 championship teams and was named Male MVP for 2009 and 2011. He is the sports ambassador of the Indian state of Haryana. Paes announced his retirement from professional tennis in 2020, before postponing his final season to 2021 following the rescheduling of the Tokyo Olympics.

Early life 
Paes was born in Calcutta, India, on 17 June 1973 to Vece Paes, a Goan, and, Jennifer Paes, from Calcutta. He studied at La Martiniere Calcutta, Madras Christian College Higher Secondary School and at St. Xavier's College. His parents were both athletes. Vece was a midfield squad member in the bronze medal-winning Indian field hockey team at the 1972 Munich Olympics although he did not personally receive a medal as he did not take to the field in any of India's matches. His mother captained the Indian basketball team in the 1980 Asian basketball championship. Paes is a direct descendant of Bengali poet Michael Madhusudan Dutta through his mother.

Paes enrolled with the Britannia Amritraj Tennis Academy in Madras (Chennai) in 1985, where he was coached by Dave O'Meara. Paes earned international fame when he won the 1990 Wimbledon Junior title and reached No. 1 in the junior world rankings at age 17.

Career

Early career (1991–1997) 
Paes first won titles at the Junior US Open and the Junior Wimbledon. He turned professional in 1991. He became number 1 in the world junior rankings. In 1992, he reached the quarter finals of the doubles event in the 1992 Barcelona Olympics with Ramesh Krishnan.

At the 1996 Atlanta Olympics he beat Fernando Meligeni to win the bronze medal, the first Indian to win an individual medal since KD Jadhav won bronze at the 1952 Helsinki Olympics. Paes cited the match as one of his greatest performances, in part because his wrist was severely injured. He was awarded the highest sporting honor by the government of India, the Major Dhyan Chand Khel Ratna in 1996.

His first successful year in the ATP circuit came in 1993, when he partnered with Sébastien Lareau to reach the US Open doubles semifinal. After a moderate season in 1994, he reached the quarter-finals of the 1995 Australian Open doubles with Kevin Ullyett. From 1996, he partnered with fellow Indian Mahesh Bhupathi. Their first year was not successful, especially in the Grand Slams, reaching the round of 32 only at Wimbledon. 1997 proved to be a much better year for the team, reaching the US Open semifinals. Paes climbed the doubles ranking from no. 89 at the beginning of the year to no. 14 at year-end. That year he made his best singles performance in a Grand Slam, losing in the third round of the 1997 US Open to Cédric Pioline after beating Carlos Costa and Arnaud Boetsch.

Rise in doubles (1998–2002) 
Paes/Bhupathi grew stronger in 1998,and reached the semifinals of three Grand Slams, the Australian Open, the French Open and the US Open. Paes had two of his biggest singles results. The first one came by winning his only ATP singles title at Newport, and the second was beating Pete Sampras, 6–3, 6–4 at the New Haven ATP tournament at their only meeting. In 1999, the duo reached the finals of all four Grand Slams, winning Wimbledon and the French, thus becoming the first Indians to win a doubles event at a Grand Slam. Paes teamed up with Lisa Raymond to win the mixed doubles event at Wimbledon. The year marked his ascent to the no. 1 doubles ranking. The following year, Paes partnered with Sébastien Lareau for the Australian and Jan Siemerink for the French, losing in the first round on both occasions. Paes again teamed with Bhupathi for the US Open, but lost in the first round again.

The duo had a disappointing second round exit to Australian duo of Todd Woodbridge and Mark Woodforde at the Sydney Olympics. Paes was given the honor of carrying the Indian Flag at the opening ceremony.

In spite of winning the French in 2001, Bhupathi/Paes had first-round exits in the other three Grand Slams. Paes was awarded the Padmashri by the Government of India in 2001. The duo of Paes and Bhupathi won the gold medal at the 2002 Asian Games in Busan. In 2002, Leander paired up with Michael Hill with moderate success.

2003–2007 
After 2003 Paes increasingly focused on doubles. He won the mixed doubles events at the Australian and Wimbledon with Martina Navratilova, both in 2003. Weeks later, Paes was admitted to the MD Anderson Cancer Center for a suspected brain tumour that was later found to be neurocysticercosis, a parasitic brain infection. He had to miss the US Open, but recovered by the end of that year.

In the 2004 Athens Olympic Games, he paired up with Bhupathi, failing again at the semifinals stage. His next Grand Slam success was in the US Open doubles event in 2006 with Martin Damm. Paes led the Indian tennis team at the Doha Asian Games in 2006 and won two golds in the men's doubles (with Bhupathi) and mixed doubles (with Sania Mirza). Paes maintained his doubles ranking in the top 20 in the world between 2005 and 2007. With wins in the Rotterdam and Indian Wells, Paes took his doubles tally to 38.

2008 
Paes/Bhupathi took part in men's doubles at the 2008 Beijing Olympics. They were eliminated in the quarter-finals by Roger Federer and Stanislas Wawrinka, who went on to win gold. With Cara Black he won the 2008 US Open mixed doubles title.

2009 
In 2009, he won the French Open and US Open Men's doubles titles with Lukáš Dlouhý and was the runner-up in mixed at the US Open.

2010 
He began the 2010 season in good form, again winning the Australian Open mixed doubles title with Cara Black. This was the pair's third consecutive Grand Slam final and the fourth overall.

2012 
Paes and Radek Štěpánek's 2012 Wimbledon tournament ended when the duo lost to Ivan Dodig and Marcelo Melo. Paes and Elena Vesnina reached the finals of the Wimbledon mixed doubles after beating Bob Bryan and Liezel Huber, 7–5, 3–6, 6–3 on 7 July. They lost in the final to Lisa Raymond and Mike Bryan 3–6, 7–5, 4–6.

In the 2012 Summer Olympics, the Indian pair (Vishnu Vardhan) lost to French team Michaël Llodra and Jo-Wilfried Tsonga, 6–7, 6–4, 3–6.

Paes and Štěpánek advanced to the finals at the 2012 US Open after their Spanish opponents, Marcel Granollers and Marc López, retired because of injury. However the duo lost in the final of US Open 2012 to the Bryan brothers.

Paes and Štěpánek kicked off the ATP World Tour Finals with a win against Pakistan's Aisam-ul-Haq Qureshi and Dutchman Jean Julien Rojer, 6–4, 7–5. They made it to the semifinals, where they were eliminated by eventual runners-up Bhupathi and Rohan Bopanna.

2013 
Paes/Štěpánek won the 2013 US Open, defeating Alexander Peya and Bruno Soares 6–1, 6–3. This was Paes' 3rd US Open men's doubles title and 14th Grand Slam title. In January 2014, Government of India announced its 3rd Highest Civilian Award Padma Bhushan for Paes.

2014 
Paes won the 2014 Malaysian Open men's doubles with Marcin Matkowski.

2015 
Paes started his 25th season on the ATP World Tour by partnering with Klaasen to reach the Chennai final, where the team lost to Lu/Marray. On 17 January, he won his 55th tour-level title in his 93rd final at Auckland, again with Klaasen. The team recorded three-match tie break victories en route to the final. With the win, Paes had won at least one trophy every season since 1997.

On 1 February, Paes captured his seventh Grand Slam mixed doubles crown at the 2015 Australian Open with Martina Hingis. It was his 15th major crown overall and his third mixed doubles triumph at Melbourne Park. The pair beat defending champions Daniel Nestor and Kristina Mladenovic in the final. As No. 7 seed with Klaasen in men's doubles, Paes lost to eventual champions Bolelli/Fognini in the second round.

At the 2015 French Open, Paes started a new partnership with Daniel Nestor. The pair crashed out in the third round; however, Paes became just the seventh male player in Open Era to complete 700 doubles wins.

At Wimbledon 2015, Paes again teamed up with Hingis to win the mixed doubles championship. The final 6–1, 6–1 score against fifth seeds Alexander Peya and Tímea Babos came after only 41 minutes. Paes/Nestor reached the third round. By winning his 4th Wimbledon mixed doubles title, Paes shared the record for men's titles in the open era with Owen Davidson.

On 12 September 2015, Paes won the mixed doubles at the 2015 US Open with Hingis, defeating Sam Querrey and Bethanie Mattek-Sands in three sets.

2016 
On 3 June 2016, Leander Paes completed his Career Grand Slam in mixed by winning the 2016 French Open with Hingis, thus joining an elite league of players. He broke Davidson's record for most men's titles. Paes qualified for the 2016 Summer Olympics in Men's Doubles and partnered with Rohan Bopanna. They lost in the first round to the Polish pair of Marcin Matkowski and Łukasz Kubot. He later paired up with Andre Begemann, where they reached the final in the Winston-Salem Open. This pair lost in the first round of the 2016 US Open. He turned up for the Davis Cup against Spain with Saketh Myneni, losing to Rafael Nadal and Marc López in 4 sets.

2017 
Paes played in the 2017 season with his 111th partner, Andre Sa. The duo lost to the Indian pair of Purav Raja and Divij Sharan in the first round of Aircel Chennai Open in straight sets. With this loss, Paes moved down to 64th in doubles ranks. Though India won their Davis Cup tie against New Zealand, Paes and his last-minute partner, Vishnu Vardhan, lost to the New Zealanders Artem Sitak/Michael Venus. Paes and Rohan Bopanna were kept as reserves by new, non-playing captain Mahesh Bhupathi for the tie against Uzbekistan. Eventually, Paes was dropped from the final four, which created controversy. Paes reached the semis of the Dubai Open and at Delray Beach. Paes then played a series of challenger events, never getting his ranking above 49th. He played with Adil Shamasdin, Scott Lipsky, and Purav Raja. It was the first time since 1996 that Paes failed to win a title or reach the final at an ATP tour event in a season.

2018 
Paes continued his partnership with Raja, losing the Maharashtra Open in the first round to defending champions Bopanna/Jeevan Nedunchezhiyan. In the Australian Open, Paes/Raja lost in the round of 16. Paes along with James Cerretani finished as runner up in the Dubai Open. Paes was recalled to India's Davis Cup squad to play against China. On 7 April 2018, Paes became the most successful player in Davis Cup history with his 43rd doubles victory. After going 0–2 down, Paes/Bopanna scripted India's comeback and in the end, India won the tie 3–2. After this, Paes skipped clay and grass court seasons. Paes was selected for the 2018 Asian Games, but the day before the Games started, he opted out citing the lack of a doubles specialist to accompany him. Paes/Cerretani played in several Challenger tournaments, before losing in the first round of the US Open. Paes also played Challengers with Miguel Ángel Reyes-Varela.

2019 
Paes/Reyes-Varela started the 2019 season at the Maharashtra Open. The duo lost a close quarter-final to the eventual champions, Bopanna/Divij Sharan, 17–15 in a match tie-break. Paes/Reyes-Varela then finished as runners-up in the Da Nang Challenger before losing in the first round of the Australian Open. Paes reached the semi-finals of the Hall of Fame Championship in July 2019.

Davis Cup 
Paes started his Davis Cup career in 1990, when he partnered Zeeshan Ali in doubles to beat the Japanese team in a five-set encounter. He played a key role on the Indian team that reached the World Group from 1991 to 1998. He was part of the Indian team that reached the semifinals 1993 with wins against Switzerland and France, eventually losing to Australia. In singles, his major wins came against the French duo of Arnaud Boetsch and Henri Leconte in 1993, Wayne Ferreira in 1994, and Goran Ivanišević in 1995 when India defeated Croatia, beating Jan Siemerink in 1996 to defeat Netherlands, and Jiří Novák in 1997. He teamed up with Bhupathi to beat Hirszon/Ivanisevic of Croatia in 1995, Damm/Korda of the Czech Republic in 1997, Massú/Ríos of Chile in 1997, Broad/Henman in 1998, and Aspelin/Björkman of Sweden in 2005. In 2007, Leander had three wins (two doubles and one singles) and no losses.

In 1993, he defeated No. 25 Arnaud Boetsch in straight sets on clay. Paes defeated Henri Leconte in the same week, and although Ramesh Krishnan won the tie-breaker against Rodolphe Gilbert, it was Paes who put that match over the top.

In 1994, he beat World No. 13 Wayne Ferreira in straight sets, but lost the overall tie.

Year-end finals 
Paes appeared with Bhupathi in six season finales.

Paes played at the year-end championships with Bhupathi each year from 1997 to 2000, as well as in 2002 and 2011, reaching three finals. In 1997 they lost the final to Rick Leach and Jonathan Stark. They lost 1999 final to Sébastien Lareau and Alex O'Brien. In 2000, they lost the final to Donald Johnson and Pieter Norval.

Playing style 
Leander has been described as having a strange playing style by Andre Agassi. He varies his play as the match goes on; he is one of the best volleyers and a talented drop shotter. His volleying techniques were learnt from former Indian player Akhtar Ali. He hits a one-handed backhand, which he drives only seldom, preferring instead to slice when returning serve or rallying from his backhand.

Other activities 
In 2010, he joined the Board of Directors of Olympic Gold Quest, a foundation co-founded by Geet Sethi and Prakash Padukone to support talented Indian athletes.

Acting career 
Leander made his film debut in Ashok Kohli's Rajdhani Express, a socio-political thriller.

Significant finals

Grand Slam finals

Doubles: 16 (8 titles, 8 runner-ups) 
By winning the 2012 Australian Open title, Paes achieved the career Grand Slam.

Mixed doubles: 18 (10 titles, 8 runner-ups)

Olympic medal matches

Singles: 1 (1 bronze medal) 
Bronze medal final

Doubles: 1

ATP career finals

Singles: 1 (1 title)

Doubles: 98 (55 titles, 43 runners-up)

ATP Challenger and ITF Futures finals

Singles: 14 (11 titles, 3 runner-ups)

Doubles: 44 (26 titles, 18 runner-ups)

Performance timelines

Singles

Doubles 
Current through the 2020 ATP Tour.

Mixed doubles

Partnerships 
Leander Paes is known for changing partnerships, and he has had over 100 different partners over his career. Paes teamed with 25 players in Grand Slam mixed doubles.

Partners in men's doubles

Partners in Mixed doubles 

 These lists consist of players who played with Paes in ATP and ITF-recognized tournaments which include the Olympics, Grand Slams, World Tour Finals, World Tour Masters, World Tour Series, Davis Cup ties, and ATP Challengers. They do not include the players who played with him in the other unrecognized multi-sport events and leagues such as World TeamTennis. The order of the players in the list is based on their first partnering with Paes. Sania Mirza had also earlier played with Paes in 2006 and 2010 in the Asian Games and Commonwealth Games.

Other partners

Indian Team 

  Mahesh Bhupathi
  Rohan Bopanna
  Sania Mirza

World Team Tennis 

  Bobby Reynolds
  Anastasia Rodionova
  Venus Williams
  Serena Williams
  Rennae Stubbs
  Scott Oudsema
  Martina Hingis
  Denis Kudla
  Sam Querrey

Champions Tennis League 

  Garbiñe Muguruza
  Somdev Devvarman

Partnership with Mahesh Bhupathi 

The duo of Leander Paes and Mahesh Bhupathi was nicknamed the ″Indian Express″. Paes' off-and-on partnership with Bhupathi drew constant media attention in their home country. In the 2006 Asian Games, a loss to the Chinese Taipei team in the team event led Leander to question Bhupathi's commitment to Team India. He once stated in an interview that although he and Bhupathi are friends, he did not consider pairing with his former teammate. However, for the 2008 Beijing Olympics, they reunited for their country, losing in the quarterfinals to eventual champions Federer/Wawrinka.

In 2011, the pair won doubles at the Chennai Open. They reunited to play in a Grand Slam Tournament after nine years and claimed runners-up in the 2011 Australian Open and reached the semifinals in the year-end championships.

The Indian duo has a 303–103 career record together. They have a high success rate against various top teams. They have a Davis Cup record for the longest doubles winning streak, with 24 straight wins.

Paes paired with Vishnu Vardhan at the London Olympics 2012, following Bhupathi and Bopanna 's refusal. Paes threatened to withdraw from the Olympics rather than play with Vardhan, whose world ranking was 296, but withdrew the threat a week later. Paes and Vardhan reached the second round of the tournament, losing to French silver medalists Llodra/Tsonga.

In 2021, Zee5 produced a documentary called Break Point, showing the ups and downs in the relationship between Paes and Bhupathi.

Davis Cup record

The duo has the longest doubles streak in Davis Cup history.(24 consecutive wins, total 25–2)

References

External links 

 
 
 
 
 
 

1973 births
Living people
Bengali people
Sportspeople from Kolkata
Goan people
St. Xavier's College, Kolkata alumni
Asian Games gold medalists for India
Australian Open (tennis) champions
French Open champions
Indian male tennis players
La Martiniere Calcutta alumni
Olympic bronze medalists for India
Olympic medalists in tennis
Olympic tennis players of India
Tennis players from Kolkata
Racket sportspeople from Goa
Recipients of the Arjuna Award
Recipients of the Padma Shri in sports
Recipients of the Khel Ratna Award
Tennis players at the 1992 Summer Olympics
Tennis players at the 1996 Summer Olympics
Tennis players at the 2000 Summer Olympics
Tennis players at the 2004 Summer Olympics
Tennis players at the 2008 Summer Olympics
Tennis players at the 2012 Summer Olympics
Tennis players at the 2016 Summer Olympics
Tennis players at the 2010 Commonwealth Games
US Open (tennis) junior champions
US Open (tennis) champions
University of Calcutta alumni
Wimbledon champions
Wimbledon junior champions
Grand Slam (tennis) champions in mixed doubles
Grand Slam (tennis) champions in men's doubles
Asian Games medalists in tennis
Tennis players at the 1990 Asian Games
Tennis players at the 1994 Asian Games
Tennis players at the 2002 Asian Games
Tennis players at the 2006 Asian Games
Recipients of the Padma Bhushan in sports
Medalists at the 1996 Summer Olympics
Commonwealth Games bronze medallists for India
Asian Games bronze medalists for India
Commonwealth Games medallists in tennis
Medalists at the 1990 Asian Games
Medalists at the 1994 Asian Games
Medalists at the 2002 Asian Games
Medalists at the 2006 Asian Games
People from New Alipore
Grand Slam (tennis) champions in boys' singles
Trinamool Congress politicians
ATP number 1 ranked doubles tennis players
ITF World Champions
Medallists at the 2010 Commonwealth Games